At Club Baby Grand is a live album by the American jazz organist Jimmy Smith, recorded at Club "Baby Grand" in Wilmington, Delaware, in 1956 and released in two volumes on the Blue Note label.

Reception
The AllMusic review by Steve Leggett states:

Track listing

Volume One
 Introduction by Mitch Thomas – 0:59
 "Sweet Georgia Brown" (Bernie, Casey, Pinkard) – 9:33
 "Where or When" (Hart, Rodgers) – 9:17
 "The Preacher" (Silver) – 11:55
 "Rosetta" (Hines, Woode) – 10:08

Volume Two
 "Caravan" (Ellington, Mills, Tizol) – 10:18
 "Love Is a Many-Splendored Thing" (Fain, Webster) – 10:46
 "Get Happy" (Arlen, Koehler) – 7:27
 "It's All Right with Me" (Porter) – 11:53

Recorded at Club "Baby Grand" in Wilmington, Delaware on August 4, 1956

Personnel

Musicians
 Jimmy Smith – organ
 Thornel Schwartz – guitar
 Donald Bailey – drums

Technical
 Alfred Lion – producer
 Rudy Van Gelder – engineer
 Reid Miles – cover design
 Francis Wolff – photography
 Leonard Feather – liner notes

References

Blue Note Records live albums
Jimmy Smith (musician) live albums
1956 live albums
Albums produced by Alfred Lion